Samuel Wanamaker,  (born Wattenmacker; June 14, 1919 – December 18, 1993) was an American actor and director who moved to the United Kingdom after becoming fearful of being blacklisted in Hollywood due to his communist views. He is credited as the person most responsible for saving The Rose Theatre, which led to the modern recreation of Shakespeare's Globe Theatre in London, where he is commemorated in the name of the Sam Wanamaker Playhouse, the site's second theatre.

Early life
Wanamaker was born in Chicago, Illinois, the son of tailor Maurice Wattenmacker (Manus Watmakher) and Molly (née Bobele). His parents were Ukrainian Jews from Mykolaiv. He was the younger of two brothers, the elder being William, long-term cardiologist at Cedars-Sinai Medical Center.

He trained at the Goodman School of Drama at the Art Institute of Chicago (now at DePaul University) and at Drake University and began working with summer stock theatre companies in Chicago and northern Wisconsin, where he helped build the stage of the Peninsula Players Theatre in 1937.

Career
Wanamaker began his acting career in traveling shows and later worked on Broadway. In 1942 he starred with Ingrid Bergman in the play Joan of Lorraine and directed Two Gentlemen from Athens the following year.

In 1943, Wanamaker was part of the cast of the play Counterattack at the National Theatre, Washington, D.C. During the play, he became enamored of the ideals of communism. He attended Drake University prior to serving in the U.S. Army between 1943 and 1946, during the Second World War. In 1947, he returned to civilian life as an actor and director. In 1948 he starred in and directed the original Broadway production of Goodbye, My Fancy.

In 1951, Wanamaker made a speech welcoming the return of two of the Hollywood Ten. In 1952, at the height of the McCarthy "Red Scare" period, Wanamaker, who was then acting in the UK, learned that despite his distinguished service in the Army during World War II, his years as a communist could lead to his being blacklisted in Hollywood. He consequently decided to remain in England, where he reestablished his career as a stage and film actor, along with becoming a director and producer. He explained:

In 1952, he made his debut as both actor and director in London in Clifford Odets' Winter Journey. The play, which co-starred Michael Redgrave, was considered "sensational" by critics. He later appeared in other plays, including The Big Knife, The Shrike, The Rainmaker, and A Hatful of Rain. In 1956 he directed the British premiere of Bertolt Brecht and Kurt Weill's musical play The Threepenny Opera (revived in New York in 1954 in a translation by Marc Blitzstein.)

In 1957, he was appointed director of the neglected New Shakespeare Theatre in Liverpool. He brought a number of notable productions to the theatre, such as A View From the Bridge, Cat on a Hot Tin Roof, The Rose Tattoo and Bus Stop. It was also transformed into a lively arts centre as a result of including other cultural attractions, such as films, lectures, jazz concerts and art exhibits.

As a result of all his various activities, Wanamaker became London's "favourite American actor and director", noted The Guardian. In 1959, he joined the Shakespeare Memorial Theatre company at Stratford-upon-Avon, playing Iago to Paul Robeson's Othello in Tony Richardson's production that year. In the 1960s and 1970s, he produced or directed several works at venues including the Royal Opera House, Covent Garden, and directed the Shakespeare Birthday Celebrations in 1974.

As a director and actor, he worked in both films and television, with roles in The Spiral Staircase (1974), Private Benjamin (1980), Superman IV: The Quest for Peace (1987), and Baby Boom (1987).

In 1968, he produced and directed the pilot episode of the Western TV series Lancer; a fictionalized version of this is depicted in the 2019 film Once Upon a Time in Hollywood, and 2021 novelization with Wanamaker portrayed by Nicholas Hammond in the film.

He also directed stage productions, including the world premiere production of Michael Tippett's opera The Ice Break. In 1980, he directed Giuseppe Verdi's opera Aida starring Luciano Pavarotti at San Francisco Opera (now broadcast version released as DVD). He was also featured as the widowed and very ruthless department store owner Simon Berrenger on the short-lived television drama Berrenger's in 1985.

Restoring the Globe Theatre

In 1970 Wanamaker's career took a dramatic turn after he was annoyed that while a number of replicas of the Globe Theatre existed in the United States, the site of the original in London was marked by only a plaque on a nearby brewery. He then made it his goal to restore an exact replica of the Globe to feature plays and a museum.

It became Wanamaker's "great obsession" to restore Shakespeare's Globe Theatre at its original location. He secured financial support from philanthropists and fellow lovers of Shakespeare, such as Samuel H. Scripps, to see that it would be created. Wanamaker then founded the Shakespeare Globe Trust, which raised well over ten million dollars.

Though, as in the late 16th and 17th centuries, the 20th century Royal family were more or less supportive, British officialdom was far less so, since they wanted to develop the site for new high-rise housing and commercial use. English Heritage, which controlled the site, refused to give Wanamaker the precise dimensions of the original Globe.

According to Karl Meyer of The New York Times:

The Shakespeare project helped Mr. Wanamaker keep his sanity and dignity intact. On his first visit to London in 1949, he had sought traces of the original theatre and was astonished to find only a blackened plaque on an unused brewery. He found this neglect inexplicable, and in 1970 launched the Shakespeare Globe Trust, later obtaining the building site and necessary permissions despite a hostile local council. He siphoned his earnings as actor and director into the project, undismayed by the scepticism of his British colleagues.

On the south bank of the River Thames in London, near where the modern recreation of Shakespeare's Globe stands today, is a plaque that reads: "In Thanksgiving for Sam Wanamaker, Actor, Director, Producer, 1919–1993, whose vision rebuilt Shakespeare's Globe Theatre on Bankside in this parish". There is a blue plaque on the river-side wall of the theatre, and the site's Jacobean indoor theatre, opened in January 2014, is named the Sam Wanamaker Playhouse after him.

For his work in reconstructing the Globe Theatre, Wanamaker, in July 1993, was made an honorary Commander of the Order of the British Empire (CBE). He was also honoured with the Benjamin Franklin Medal by the Royal Society of Arts in recognition of his contribution to theatre.

When multi-Tony Award-winning British actor Mark Rylance accepted his third Tony on stage in New York City during the televised ceremonies on June 8, 2014, he did so with a note of thanks to Wanamaker.

Personal life
In 1940, Wanamaker married Canadian actress Charlotte Holland.

In her 2014 memoir, I Said Yes to Everything, Lee Grant claimed that during production of the film Voyage of the Damned (1976), Wanamaker engaged in an affair with British actress Lynne Frederick, who was twenty-one at the time.

Actress Zoë Wanamaker is his daughter and film historian Marc Wanamaker is his nephew.

Death
Wanamaker died of prostate cancer in London on December 18, 1993, aged 74, prior to the grand opening of the Globe by Queen Elizabeth II on June 12, 1997. He was survived by three daughters, Abby, Zoë, and Jessica.

Filmography

Actor

My Girl Tisa (1948) as Mark Denek
Give Us This Day (1949) as Geremio
Mr. Denning Drives North (1952) as Chick Eddowes
The Secret (1955) as Nick Delaney
The Battle of the Sexes (1959) as Narrator (voice)
The Criminal (1960) as Mike Carter
Taras Bulba (1962) as Filipenko
Man in the Middle (1964) as Maj. Leon Kaufman, a psychiatrist
The Spy Who Came In from the Cold (1965) as Peters
Those Magnificent Men in Their Flying Machines (1965) as George Gruber
Warning Shot (1967) as Frank Sanderman
The Day the Fish Came Out (1967) as Elias
Danger Route (1968) as Lucinda
Arturo UI (1972, TV Movie) as O'Casey
The Law (1974, TV Movie) as Jules Benson
Mousey (1974, TV Movie) as Inspector
The Spiral Staircase (1975) as Lieutenant Fields
The Sell Out (1976) as Harry Sickles
Voyage of the Damned (1976) as Carl Rosen
Billy Jack Goes to Washington (1977) as Bailey
The Billion Dollar Bubble (1978) as Stanley Goldblum
Death on the Nile (1978) as Sterndale Rockford
Holocaust (1978, TV mini-series) as Moses Weiss
Contro 4 bandiere (1979) as Ray MacDonald
Charlie Muffin (1979, TV Movie) as Ruttgers
Private Benjamin (1980) as Teddy Benjamin
The Competition (1980) as Andrew Erskine

Winston Churchill: The Wilderness Years (1981) as Bernard Baruch
Our Family Business (1981, TV Movie) as Ralph
I Was a Mail Order Bride (1982, TV Movie) as Frank Tosconi
Heartsounds (1984, TV Movie) as Moe Silverman
Irreconcilable Differences (1984) as David Kessler
The Ghost Writer (1984, TV Movie) as E.I. Lonoff
Berrenger's (1985, TV Series) as Simon Berrenger
The Aviator (1985) as Bruno Hansen
Embassy (1985, TV Movie) as Ambassador Arthur Ingram
Deceptions (1985, TV Movie) as Jim Nolan
Raw Deal (1986) as Luigi Patrovita
Sadie and Son (1987, TV Movie) as Marty Goldstein
Baby Boom (1987) as Fritz Curtis
Superman IV: The Quest for Peace (1987) as David Warfield
The Two Mrs. Grenvilles (1987, TV Movie) as District Attorney
Baby Boom (1988, TV series based on the 1987 film) as Fritz Curtis
Judgment in Berlin (1988) as Bernard Hellring
Tajna manastirske rakije (1988) as Ambassador Morley
The Shell Seekers (1989, TV Movie) as Richard
Always Remember I Love You (1990, TV Movie) as Grandfather Mendham
Running Against Time (1990, TV Movie) as Doctor Koopman
Guilty by Suspicion (1991) as Felix Graff
Pure Luck (1991) as Highsmith
City of Joy (1992) (uncredited)
Killer Rules (1993, TV Movie) as Gambon
Bloodlines: Murder in the Family (1993, TV Movie) as Gerald Woodman 
Wild Justice (1994, TV Movie) as Kingston Parker (final film role)

Television
Holocaust (1978 TV Mini-Series) as Moses Weiss
Cameo Theatre in "Manhattan Footstep" (episode # 1.4) June 7, 1950
Danger Man – as Patrick Laurence in "The Lonely Chair" (episode # 1.8) October 30, 1960
The Defenders – as Dr. Ralph Ames in "The Hundred Lives of Harry Simms" (episode # 1.7) October 28, 1961
The Defenders – as James Henry David in "A Book for Burning" (episode # 2.27) March 30, 1963
Man of the World – as Nicko in "The Bandit" (episode # 2.1) May 11, 1963
Espionage – as Sprague in "Festival of Pawns" (episode # 1.10) December 11, 1963
The Outer Limits – as Dr. Simon Holm in "A Feasibility Study" (episode # 1.29) April 13, 1964
The Defenders – as Edward Banter in "Hollow Triumph" (episode # 3.35) June 20, 1964
The Defenders – as United States Attorney Brooker in "A Taste of Ashes" (episode # 4.8) November 12, 1964
The Wild Wild West – as Dr. Arcularis in "The Night of the Howling Light" (episode # 1.14) December 17, 1965
Gunsmoke – as Asa Longworth in "Parson Comes to Town" (episode # 11.31) April 30, 1966
Run for Your Life – as Major Joe Rankin in two episodes
The Baron – as Sefton Folkard in "You Can't Win Them All" (episode # 1.19) February 1, 1967
Judd for the Defense – as Shelly Gould in "The Gates of Cerberus" (episode # 2.8) November 15, 1968
Thirty-Minute Theatre in "A Wen" (episode # 1.233) December 27, 1971
Rafferty – as Hollander in "Rafferty" (Pilot) (episode # 1.1) September 5, 1977
Return of the Saint – as Domenico in "Dragonseed" (episode # 1.22) February 25, 1979

Director
The Defenders (TV series) – episode "Eyewitness" (1965)
Court Martial (TV series) – episode "The Bitter Wind" (1966)
Hawk (TV series) – episodes "Do Not Mutilate or Spindle", "Game with a Dead End" and "How Close Can You Get?" (1966)
Cimarron Strip (TV series) – episode "Broken Wing" (1967)
Custer (TV series) – episode "Sabers in the Sun" (1967)
Dundee and the Culhane (TV series) – episode "The Jubilee Raid Brief" (1967)
Coronet Blue (TV series) – episodes "The Rebels", "Man Running", "Saturday" and "The Presence of Evil" (1967)
Lancer (TV series) – episode "The High Riders" (1968)
Premiere (TV series) – episode "Lassiter" (1968)
The Champions (TV series) – episode "To Trap A Rat" (1968)
The File of the Golden Goose (1969)
The Executioner (1970)
Catlow (1971)
Sinbad and the Eye of the Tiger (1977)
Columbo: The Bye-Bye Sky High IQ Murder Case (1977) (TV)
David Cassidy - Man Undercover (TV series) – episode "Cage of Steel" (1978)
Hart to Hart (TV series) – episode "Death in the Slow Lane" (1979)
Return of the Saint (TV series) – episode "Vicious Circle" (1979)
Mrs. Columbo aka Kate Loves a Mystery (TV series) – episodes "A Puzzle for Prophets" and "Falling Star" (1979)
The Killing of Randy Webster (1981) (TV)
Columbo: Grand Deceptions (1989) (TV)

Notes

References

External links

, video
Interview with Sam Wanamaker, September 18, 1992 [Mostly about directing opera]

1919 births
1993 deaths
Male actors from Chicago
American emigrants to England
American expatriates in England
Film directors from Illinois
American male film actors
American male radio actors
American male stage actors
American theatre directors
Burials at Southwark Cathedral
Deaths from cancer in England
Deaths from prostate cancer
Drake University alumni
Jewish American male actors
American male Shakespearean actors
Laurence Olivier Award winners
Hollywood blacklist
United States Army soldiers
United States Army personnel of World War II
Jewish socialists
20th-century American male actors
American people of Ukrainian-Jewish descent
Honorary Commanders of the Order of the British Empire